Alcohol dehydrogenase 1C is an enzyme that in humans is encoded by the ADH1C gene.

Function 

This gene encodes class I alcohol dehydrogenase, gamma subunit, which is a member of the alcohol dehydrogenase family. Members of this enzyme family metabolize a wide variety of substrates, including ethanol (beverage alcohol), retinol, other aliphatic alcohols, hydroxysteroids, and lipid peroxidation products. Class I alcohol dehydrogenase, consisting of several homo- and heterodimers of alpha, beta, and gamma subunits, exhibit high activity for ethanol oxidation and play a major role in ethanol catabolism. Three genes encoding alpha, beta and gamma subunits are tandemly organized in a genomic segment as a gene cluster.

References

Further reading

External links